A suitcase nuclear device (also suitcase nuke, suitcase bomb, backpack nuke, snuke, mini-nuke, and pocket nuke) is a tactical nuclear weapon that is portable enough that it could use a suitcase as its delivery method.

Both the United States and the Soviet Union developed nuclear weapons small enough to be portable in specially-designed backpacks during the 1950s and 1960s.

Neither the United States nor the Soviet Union have ever made public the existence or development of weapons small enough to fit into a normal-sized suitcase or briefcase. The W48 however, does fit the criteria of small, easily disguised, and portable. Its explosive yield was extremely small for a nuclear weapon.

In the mid-1970s, debate shifted from the possibility of developing such a device for the military to concerns over its possible use in nuclear terrorism. The concept became a staple of the spy thriller genre in the later Cold War era.

Etymology
The term "suitcase (nuclear/atomic) bomb" was introduced during the 1950s with the prospect of reducing the size of the smallest tactical nuclear weapons even further, albeit purely as a "figure of speech" for miniaturization, not necessarily for the delivery in actual suitcases.

Overview
The value of portable nuclear weapons lies in their ability to be easily smuggled across borders, transported by means widely available, and placed as close to the target as possible. In nuclear weapon design, there is a trade-off in small weapons designs between weight and compact size.

Soviet Union and Russia

The existence and whereabouts of Soviet suitcase nuclear bombs became an increasing subject of debate following the disarray that followed the collapse of the Soviet Union. Namely, major concerns regarding the new government’s overall security and control of its nuclear stockpile came into question on 30 May 1997 when an American congressional delegation sent to Russia met with General Aleksandr Lebed, former Secretary of the Russian Security Council. During the meeting, Lebed mentioned the possibility that several suitcase portable nuclear bombs had gone missing. More specifically, according to an investigation Lebed led during his time as acting secretary, it was concluded that 84 of these devices were unaccounted for. Lebed would make several press releases and television interviews regarding the matter later in the year.

Among these releases, Lebed in an interview with CBS newsmagazine Sixty Minutes on 7 September 1997 claimed that the Russian military had lost track of more than a hundred out of a total of 250 "suitcase-sized nuclear bombs". Lebed stated that these devices were made to look like suitcases, and that he had learned of their existence only a few years earlier. Russia's Federal Agency on Atomic Energy on 10 September rejected Lebed's claims as baseless.

Despite the Russian government’s rejection of Lebed’s claims however, the resulting public interest from Lebed's television appearances would eventually provoke a congressional hearing held between 1-2 October 1997 intended on discussing "Nuclear Terrorism and Countermeasures." Chief among these talks was the matter of Russian suitcase portable nuclear bombs and the circulating rumors of these weapons proliferating in the wild.

Although absent from the hearing himself, Lebed's interviews were frequently cited as a cause for concern throughout the duration of this hearing, particularly the 84 missing devices and their apparent capacity to kill 100,000 people each. Present in the witness panel to help corroborate Lebed's claims however was the former Russian Security Council environmental advisor Alexei Yablokov who also served as chairman of the Environmental Security Commission and was highly regarded by his peers in the Russian Federation Academy of Scientists at the time. These experiences proved vital in his testimony to come. 

Yablokov himself made a television interview on NTV shortly after Lebed, and also drafted a letter to Novaya Gazeta affirming both the existence of suitcase nukes and the possibility that some may in fact be missing. Yablokov also clarified that these devices existed as far back as the 1970s. In these communications, Yablokov claimed to have met with many of the researchers who had a hand in developing suitcase nukes. Moreover, his main contention regarding Moscow’s denial was that these devices were never listed on any inventory list to begin with due to their highly sensitive nature, particularly as a result of their supposed use by the USSR’s KGB with targets ranging from the United States to various NATO countries in eastern Europe. Thus, the confirmation of these weapons’ existence in addition to the security and inventory of these weapons would ultimately produce misleading results.

During the hearing itself, Yablokov would maintain his position that KGB nuclear weapon caches continue to exist in operation independent of the recently defunct USSR Ministry of Defense, providing further insight as to why the Russian government and witnesses’ claims contradicted so greatly. Moreover, Yablokov further clarified his source of information, which up until this point remained ambiguous, citing communications between scientists working at the Krasnoyarsk-26, Tomsk-7, Chelialinsk-65, and Penza-19 nuclear installations located across Russia. Granted to relevancy of the perceived threat of these suitcase nuclear bombs was reconsidered as Yablokov explained that if these weapons were developed in the 1970s, then the warheads would have needed to be replaced twice at that point, a possibility he could not guarantee. 

Stanislav Lunev, the highest-ranking GRU defector, claimed that such Russian-made devices exist and described them in more detail. The devices, "identified as RA-115s (or RA-115-01s for submersible weapons)" weigh from fifty to sixty pounds. They can last for many years if wired to an electric source. In case there is a loss of power, there is a battery backup. If the battery runs low, the weapon has a transmitter that sends a coded message either by satellite or directly to a GRU post at a Russian embassy or consulate. According to Lunev, the number of "missing" nuclear devices (as found by General Lebed) "is almost identical to the number of strategic targets upon which those bombs would be used."

Lunev suggested that suitcase nukes might be already deployed by the GRU operatives on US soil to assassinate US leaders in the event of war. He alleged that arms caches were hidden by the KGB on many countries. They were booby-trapped with "Lightning" explosive devices. One such cache, identified by Vasili Mitrokhin, exploded when Swiss authorities sprayed it with a high pressure water gun in a wooded area near Bern. Several others caches were removed successfully. Lunev said that he had personally looked for hiding places for weapons caches in the Shenandoah Valley area and that "it is surprisingly easy to smuggle nuclear weapons into the US" either across the Mexican border or using a small transport missile that can slip undetected when launched from a Russian airplane. US Congressman Curt Weldon supported claims by Lunev but noted that Lunev had "exaggerated things" according to the FBI. Searches of the areas identified by Lunev have been conducted, "but law-enforcement officials have never found such weapons caches, with or without portable nuclear weapons."

The existence of such weapons  and their potential usefulness, yield and lethality after a prolonged period of years  remains controversial.

United States
The lightest nuclear warhead ever acknowledged to have been manufactured by the U.S. is the W54, which was used in both the Davy Crockett 120 mm recoilless rifle-launched warhead and the backpack-carried version called the Mk-54 SADM (Special Atomic Demolition Munition).

Former Under-Secretary of Defense for Intelligence Michael G. Vickers has claimed that he, along with other Green Berets special forces troops, practiced infiltrating Warsaw Pact countries with backpack-sized nuclear weapons, with a mission to "detonate a portable nuclear bomb." These were known as Green Light Teams.

In 1994, the United States Congress passed The National Defense Authorization Act for Fiscal Year 1994, preventing the government from developing nuclear weapons with a yield of less than 5 kilotons, thereby making the official development of these weapons in the US unlawful. This law was repealed in the National Defense Authorization Act for Fiscal Year 2004.

Israel

Allegations were made in the 1990s that Israel had developed suitcase nuclear bombs during the 1970s.

See also
AIM-26 Falcon
Dirty bomb
Neutron bomb
 The Fourth Protocol, a 1984 novel about smuggling a suitcase bomb to UK
W25 (nuclear warhead)
W33 (nuclear warhead)

References

External links

Suitcase Nukes by National Terror Alert Response Center
Suitcase Nukes: Permanently Lost Luggage by SAST REPORT
Alexander Lebed and Suitcase Nukes
Are Suitcase Bombs Possible?
"Suitcase Nukes": A Reassessment, 2002 article by the Center for Nonproliferation Studies at the Monterey Institute of International Studies
W54 SADM photo by Brookings Institution
Article discussing the development of smaller nuclear weapons in the U.S.A.

Nuclear terrorism
Tactical nuclear weapons
Terrorism tactics
Weapons of Russia
Weapons of the Cold War